Niji ( "Rainbow") is the third studio album by Japanese recording artist Yui Aragaki. It was released on September 22, 2010.

Background 
The album includes Aragaki's previously digitally released "Walk" and "Chiisana Koi no Uta" (a Mongol800 cover) as well "Hanamizuki", a Yō Hitoto cover and theme song to Aragaki's film Hanamizuki. It was released in three formats: CD-only standard edition, limited edition A, which has an illustration cover drawn by Aragaki and comes priced at 2,000 yen, and limited edition B, which comes with a bonus DVD that includes the music videos for "Chiisana Koi no Uta", "Walk" and "Hanamizuki".

Chart performance 
Niji debuted on the daily Oricon albums chart at #2 with 5,955 copies sold. It peaked at #4 on the weekly charts with 19,888 copies sold, making it Aragaki's third consecutive album to debut in the top 5.

Track listing

Charts and sales

Release history

References

External links 

2010 albums
Yui Aragaki albums
Warner Music Japan albums